Axel: The Biggest Little Hero (original title: Bonta) is a 2013 animated 3-D film written and directed by Leo Lee. The English-language version stars the voices of Yuri Lowenthal, Sarah Natochenny, Colleen O'Shaughnessey, Kate Higgins and Ed Asner.  Under its original title of Bonta, the film released nationwide across China on August 2, 2013, as China's very first 3-D film to combine stereoscopic effects with CG technology, representing their highest level of animation.

The English-language version titled Axel: The Biggest Little Hero was released on DVD in the United States on June 3, 2014.

Plot
On the planet Earth, Axel (Yuri Lowenthal) and his best friend Jono (Colleen O'Shaughnessey) go out in search of a magical plant from the Bonta Forest that will feed their starving tribe, but they are threatened by the Lizard King (Matthew Lillard) who wants to take over the forest. The two become friends with a brave princess and a giant ostrich robot (Marc Thompson) who assist them on their journey for the plant.

English cast
 Yuri Lowenthal as Axel
 Colleen O'Shaughnessey as Jono 
 Kate Higgins as Gaga
 Edward Asner as Bonta
 Tim Curry as Papa Qi 
 Matthew Lillard as Lizard King
 George Takei as Elder 
 Marc Thompson as 1st & 4th Guardians, Pootron, Mecha Lizard
 Sarah Natochenny as Boca 
 Alyson Leigh Rosenfeld as Second Guardian
 Rebecca Soler as Neepop 
 Veronica Taylor as Young Gaga

Release

The 3-D film released  nationwide across China under its original title of Bonta on August 2, 2013, before heading to film festivals in Europe and South Korea.  The project screened October 3, 2013 at the 18th Busan International Film Festival and "won wide popularity among the viewers and Korean media".

DVD
As Axel: The Biggest Little Hero, the film was released on DVD in the United States on June 3, 2014.

Reception 
Common Sense Media gave the film three out of five stars, expressing frustration over the film's lack of immediate resolution while also commenting that they enjoyed the relationship between Axel and Jono. Dove was more wholly positive and called Axel a "charming and unique animated movie". Aced Magazine generally praised the film, remarking that the strangely animated characters would be appreciated by the target audience of small children. They also advised that since the adventure "gets a little rough" for youngsters, they that parents watch the film their children.

References

External links
 

2013 films